Serow may refer to:
Three species of Asian ungulate in the genus Capricornis
Japanese serow
Mainland serow
Taiwan serow
 Serow, Iran, a city in Urmia County, West Azarbaijan Province, Iran 
Alternative spelling of Serov